Elda Cerrato (14 October 1930 – 17 February 2023) was an Italian-born Argentine artist who was professor at the Universidad de Buenos Aires, and lifelong partner of composer Luis Zubillaga.

Career 
Cerrato had 21 solo exhibitions in Argentina and abroad, including, the Buenos Aires Museum of Modern Art, Museo de Bellas Artes de Caracas and the Art Museum of the Americas, USA. 

From 1962, she participated in more than 150 group exhibitions with paintings, drawings, installations, performances in Americas and Europe; including eight International Biennials where she received awards.

Cerrato was Professor Consultant of Art at the Universidad de Buenos Aires and Academic Advisor to other universities in South America.

Cerrato published articles, produced artists’s films, participated in radio programs, partaken as a member of academic and artist juries, and given conferences and seminars.

Art historians and art critics who have written about her work include, Juan Calzadilla, Margarita D’Amico, Aldo Pellegrini, Rubén Astudillos, Marta Traba, Jorge Glusberg, Horacio Safons, Roberto Guevara, Sofía Imbert, Luis Lozada Sucre, Rosa Faccaro, César Magrini, Elsa Flores Ballesteros, Aldo Galli, Dora Fornaciari, Ernesto Ramallo, León Benarós, Jacobo Romano, Alfredo Andrés, Lelia Driven, Elena Oliveras, Raúl Santana, Alberto Collazo, Albino Diéguez Videla, Eduardo Carvallido, Julio Sapolnik, Bélgica Rodríguez, Moraima Guanipa, Rubén Wisotzki, Maritza Jiménez, Jorge López Anaya, and Ana Longoni.

Cerrato was one of eight artists awarded the 2019 Premio Nacional a la Trayectoria Artística in Argentina.

In 2022, Elda Cerrato received the prestigious Premio Velázquez.

Cerrato died on 17 February 2023, at the age of 92.

Exhibitions
1978 – ArteUna 
1986 – Memory in Edges
1989 – The Eye and the Fissure - Arte Nuevo Gallery (Alvaro Castagnino)
1990 – Picturae Lapidis Volantis
1992 – Paintings. Acrylic on canvas paintings.
1993 – Painting and Metamorphosis
1993 – Cosmogonies
2021 – "El dia maravilloso de los pueblos". Museo de Arte Moderno con versión LSA.

Bibliography 
Panorama de la Pintura Argentina, Aldo Pellegrini, 1967, Ed. Paidós, Bs. As.
Horacio Safons, Elda Cerrato: Pintura y Metamorfosis, catálogo exposición, Sala Alternativa, 1993, Caracas

References

External links
Artist's website
http://www.fundacionstart.org.ar/

1930 births
2023 deaths
20th-century Argentine painters
Argentine women painters